India's history in rowing dates back to the British era. The first club, the Calcutta Rowing Club was founded in 1858. The Rowing Federation of India administers the sport in the country. India's first ever Asian Games gold medal was won by Bajrang Lal Takhar in 2010 but the country has never won an Olympic medal in the sport. Three Indian rowers have qualified for the 2012 London Olympics.

References

External links
 Rowing Federation of India